Val-Alain is a municipality in the Municipalité régionale de comté de Lotbinière in Quebec, Canada. It is part of the Chaudière-Appalaches region and the population is 930 as of 2009. It is named after Alain Chartier Joly de Lotbinière, grandson of Henri-Gustave Joly de Lotbinière, former premier of Quebec. "Monsieur Alain," as he was known, headed the Lotbinière seigneurie from 1911 to 1954.

References

Commission de toponymie du Québec
Ministère des Affaires municipales, des Régions et de l'Occupation du territoire

External links
Val-Alain municipal website

Municipalities in Quebec
Incorporated places in Chaudière-Appalaches
Lotbinière Regional County Municipality